Elbow grease is an idiom for manual labour and the process of working hard to accomplish an objective. It is a figure of speech for indicating that nothing other than one's own labour is required for a task, capable of being used in a humorous way. Oxford Languages defines “elbow grease” as “hard physical work, especially vigorous polishing or cleaning”

Origins
The first use of the phrase in print was in 1672. Andrew Marvell, an English metaphysical poet, used the words in a satirical book about English parliament. Marvell wrote: "Two or three brawny Fellows in a Corner, with mere Ink and Elbow-grease, do more Harm than an Hundred systematical Divines with their sweaty Preaching."

In 1699, the phrase appeared in the New Dictionary of the Canting Crew defined as "a derisory Term for Sweat". The phrase had existed for sometime before that, known as "the best substance for polishing furniture".

See also
 List of practical joke topics

References

Practical jokes
English-language idioms